Bootle is a civil parish in the Borough of Copeland, Cumbria, England.  It contains 13 listed buildings that are recorded in the National Heritage List for England.  Of these, two are listed at Grade II*, the middle of the three grades, and the others are at Grade II, the lowest grade.  The parish contains the village of Bootle and the surrounding countryside.  The listed buildings comprise houses and associated structures, churches and associated structures, a school, a station waiting room, and a village cross.


Key

Buildings

References

Citations

Sources

Lists of listed buildings in Cumbria
Listed buildings